Jurgis Astikas or Jurgis Astikaitis (1530–1579)  was a Lithuanian nobleman of the Grand Duchy of Lithuania and a member of the noble Astikai family. He participated in the Livonian War and signing of the election of king Henry of Valois after the death of king Sigismund Augustus in 1572. Jurgis was executed in Lithuania in 1579 under suspicions of plotting to assassinate king Stephen Báthory. Jurgis did not leave any descendants.

References

1530 births
1579 deaths
Astikai family
Voivodes of Smolensk